Anadevidia peponis is a moth of the family Noctuidae. It is found in south-east Asia, including Japan, India. Taiwan and New South Wales in Australia. It is a minor pest on many cucurbits.

Description
The wingspan is about 40 mm. Palpi with short third joint. Hind femur of male not tufted with long hair. Body greyish brown without rosy tinge. Forewings with bronze patches instead of coppery, where the postmedial line sinuous. Larva greenish with lateral black spots. There are some short black pointed spines found on the back, stoutest on the 4th to 7th and 11th somites. A prominent white sub-dorsal and lateral waved line present.

Eggs are white and spherical. The larvae feed on Cucurbitaceae species, including Citrullus lanatus, Cucumis sativus, Cucurbita moschata, Cucurbita pepo, Momordica charantia, Sechium edule and Trichosanthes cucumerina.

Gallery

References

External links
Species info
Identification of Sex Pheromones of Anadevidia peponis and Macdunnoughia confusa and Field Tests of Their Role in Reproductive Isolation of Closely Related Plusiinae Moths
Regulation of sex pheromone biosynthesis in three plusiinae moths: Macdunnoughia confusa, Anadevidia peponis, and Chrysodeixis eriosoma
Pheromones and Semiochemicals of Anadevidia peponis

Plusiinae
Moths of Asia
Moths of Australia
Moths described in 1775
Taxa named by Johan Christian Fabricius